The Kuala Lumpur City Hall (abbreviated DBKL) is the city council which administers the city of Kuala Lumpur in Malaysia. This council was established after the city was officially granted city status on 1 February 1972. Their jurisdiction covers an area of 243 square kilometres.

The council consists of the mayor plus fifteen members of the city advisory board appointed to serve a one-year term by the Minister of Territories. The current mayor of Kuala Lumpur is Mahadi Che Ngah, who has been in office since 1 October 2020.

History 
The agency was formerly known as Kuala Lumpur Municipal Council (Malay: Majlis Perbandaran Kuala Lumpur). During British colonial times and early independence, Kuala Lumpur had been the capital of the country as well as the state of Selangor.

On 1 April 1961, the name changed into Kuala Lumpur Federal Capital Commission (Malay: Suruhanjaya Ibu Kota Persekutuan).

Kuala Lumpur later achieved city status on 1 February 1972, becoming the first settlement in Malaysia to be granted the status after independence. The name changed into Kuala Lumpur City Hall (Malay: Dewan Bandaraya Kuala Lumpur). Later, on 1 February 1974, Kuala Lumpur became a Federal Territory. Kuala Lumpur ceased to be the capital of Selangor in 1978 after the city of Shah Alam was declared as the new state capital.

Kuala Lumpur was administered by a corporation sole called the Federal Capital Commissioner (Malay: Pesuruhjaya Ibu Kota Persekutuan) from 1 April 1961 until it was awarded city status on 1 February 1972, after which executive power was transferred to the Mayor (Malay: Datuk Bandar).

Executive power lies with the mayor in the city hall, who is appointed for three years by the Minister of Federal Territories. This system of appointing the mayor and councillor has been in place ever since the local government elections were suspended in 1970.

On 14 May 1990, Kuala Lumpur celebrated 100 years of local council. The new Federal Territory of Kuala Lumpur flag and anthem were introduced. Kuala Lumpur City Hall launched its emblem on 31 January 1992, incorporated the city's emblem in use since Kuala Lumpur became a city.

Appointed mayors of Kuala Lumpur
Since 1972, the city has been led by twelve mayors. The previous mayors are listed as below:

Current city council

Top management

Mahadi Che Ngah, Mayor
Azmi Abdul Hamid, executive director (Project Management)
Sulaiman Mohamed, executive director (Planning)
Anwar Mohd. Zain, executive director (Socio-Economic Development)
Kamarulzaman Mat Salleh, executive director (Management)

City advisory board
The city advisory board makes recommendations on Council's strategic policy and priorities, governance policy and structure, financial planning and budgeting, fiscal policy including revenue and tax policies, intergovernmental and international relations, Council and its operations, and human resources and labour relations.

This session serves from 2020-2022, :

Departments

Branch office
Bandar Tun Razak
Batu
Bukit Bintang
Cheras
Kepong
Lembah Pantai
Segambut
Seputeh
Setiawangsa
Titiwangsa
Wangsa Maju

List of legislations

Past Management Members

Top Management
Nor Hisham Ahmad Dahlan, Mayor
Mohd Najib Mohd, executive director (Project Management)
Mahadi Che Ngah, executive director (Planning)
Ibrahim Yusoff, executive director (Socio-Economic Development)
Mustafa Mohd Nor, executive director (Management)
City advisory board
Nor Hisham Ahmad Dahlan, Chairman
Abdul Ghani Pateh Akhir, Member
Fateh Iskandar Mohamed Mansor, Member
Ezumi Harzani Ismail, Member

References

External links

 Official Website of Kuala Lumpur City Hall

Buildings and structures in Kuala Lumpur
Kuala Lumpur
City councils in Malaysia
Ministry of Territories (Malaysia)
1972 establishments in Malaysia